Arles station (French: Gare d'Arles) is a railway station serving the city of Arles, Bouches-du-Rhône, southeastern France. The station was opened in 1848 and is located on the Paris–Marseille railway. The train services are operated by SNCF.

Train services
The following services call at Arles:

High Speed services (TGV) Paris - Valence - Avignon - Miramas
Intercity services (Intercités) Bordeaux - Toulouse - Montpellier - Marseille
Express services (TER Occitanie) Narbonne - Montpellier - Nîmes - Arles - Marseille
Express services (TER PACA) Lyon - Valence - Montélimar - Avignon - Marseille
Local services (TER PACA) Avignon - Arles - Miramas - Marseille

References

Railway stations in Bouches-du-Rhône
TER Provence-Alpes-Côte-d'Azur
Railway stations in France opened in 1848